Bush presidential campaign may refer to any of the following presidential campaigns conducted by members of the Bush family:

 George H. W. Bush 1980 presidential campaign, failed campaign for Republican nomination but resulted in Bush being nominated for the vice presidency
 George H. W. Bush 1988 presidential campaign, successful campaign
 George H. W. Bush 1992 presidential campaign, failed re-election campaign 
 George W. Bush 2000 presidential campaign, successful campaign
 George W. Bush 2004 presidential campaign, successful re-election campaign
 Jeb Bush 2016 presidential campaign, failed primary campaign